"Cloud 9" is a song by English singer Ms. Dynamite and English record producer Shy FX. It was released on 20 October 2013 through Shy FX's record label Digital Soundboy. The song will appear on Ms. Dynamite's forthcoming EP on the label. It entered the UK Singles Chart at number 62.

Music video
The music video for the song was released onto Ms. Dynamite's YouTube channel on 7 October 2013 and lasts a total length of four minutes.

Track listing

Charts

References

2013 songs
2013 singles
Shy FX songs
Ms. Dynamite songs
Songs written by Ms. Dynamite